Agrotis radians (brown cutworm) is a moth of the family Noctuidae. It is found in the Australian Capital Territory, Queensland, New South Wales and Tasmania.

The wingspan is about 40 mm.

The larvae feed on Portulaca oleracea and a wide range of crops, such as Zea mays, Triticium, Nicotiana tabacum, Lycopersicon, Gossypium, Medicago sativum, Pinus and Pseudotsuga menziesii.

External links
 Australian Caterpillars
 Australian Faunal Directory

Agrotis
Moths of Australia
Moths described in 1852